I'm Still Alive may refer to:

"I'm Still Alive" (TWiiNS song), Slovakian 2011 Eurovision song
"I'm Still Alive", a 1979 ABBA song
I'm Still Alive (film), a 1940 American film

See also
"Alive" (Pearl Jam song), a single from the 1991 album Ten